Jagodina is a city and the administrative center of the Pomoravlje District in central Serbia. It is situated on the banks of the Belica River, in the geographical region of Šumadija. The city itself has a population of 43,311 inhabitants, while its administrative area comprises 76,712 inhabitants.

Name
The town was first mentioned in 1399 as "Jagodna", derived from the Serbian word for 'strawberry' - Jagoda. From 1946 to 1992 the town was renamed Svetozarevo after the 19th-century Serbian socialist Svetozar Marković.

History

Early history
In the early Neolithic settlement, the world's largest collection of prehistoric artefacts was found, with nearly a 100 manlike figures made of stone, bones and clay, about 8000 years old. Geophysical research in 2012 in the area of Belica uncovered a prehistoric settlement, surrounded by a circular trench that has a  diameter. Inside that circle, triangular, trapezoid and circular shaped foundations of monumental structures were found, unlike any found in other early Neolithic settlements.

Gold bracelets similar to ones found on the nearby Juhor mountain dating to the Middle Bronze Age have been found in Trcevac. In addition, Bronze Age settlement  has been discovered in a part of town called Sarina Međa. In the village of Belica, near Jagodina, Europe's oldest sanctuary is found.

Ancient times
On top of Juhor mountain there was a Celtic oppidum, and in the village of Novo Lanište a Triballi settlement. With the Roman conquest of 74 BCE, the territory of today's Jagodina fell under the Roman authority. Romans had a castle on the hill known as Đurđevo Brdo, and a settlement beneath it. Ad Octavium was a spot on the military road upon which the village Drazmirovac stands today.

Мedieval history
Coins of Emperor Phokas and Constantine IV from 643/4 and fibulae have been found in the region, as well as Early Slavic pottery dating to the 6th century. In 1183 Grand Prince Stefan Nemanja liberated the areas of Belica, Levač and Lepenica from the rule of Byzantine Empire. Jagodina was situated in the Belica county. Jagodina was first mentioned in 1399 in a letter to Princess Milica (the wife of Prince Lazar Hrebeljanović). Its second recorded mention was in 1411, when the Parliament was held there. After the year 1458, Jagodina falls into the hands of the Ottoman Empire. During the second half of the 15th century, in the Ottoman Empire's tax registers, a certain Miloš Belmužević is mentioned as the landlord of Jagodina. He later fled to Hungary.

Ottoman period
During the middle of the 16th century Jagodina becomes a feud of a Dervish-bey Jahjapašić. A large mosque is built there in 1555, and sometime latter, another one. Jagodina had two caravan stations and a public bathroom. In Jagodina, by the command of Dervish-bey, certain German clockmaker built a clock tower, which was a rarity in Ottoman Empire at the time. In 1553-1557 the travelers refer to Jagodina as a beautiful settlement with 4 caravan stations and two mosques. In it lived more of sipahis and Ottoman soldiers, and less Christian Serbs. It had a Turkish school.
With the status of a palanka (small town), Jagodina is mentioned in 1620, as a small stop on the road to Istanbul. In the year 1660, a traveler named Evlija Čelebija states that the town has 1500 houses and that the entire population is made of Christians that were converted to Islam. In the middle of the 17th century Jagodina gets its own bedesten.
After the Austrian-Turkish war (1716-1718), Jagodina becomes the capital of the District of Jagodina. According to Austrian register in 1721. Jagodina had 162 families living in it. After the new Austrian-Turkish war (1737-1739), Serbia is back under the Ottoman rule.

Modern history
During the Serbian Revolution (1804–1815), when Serbs began their uprising against the centuries-long Ottoman rule, Jagodina was a scene of numerous battles, given the town's strategic importance within Serbia proper. Following the Ottoman defeat and re-establishment of the Kingdom of Serbia, Jagodina experienced a period of relative industrial and civic development. From 1929 to 1941, Jagodina was part of the Morava Banovina of the Kingdom of Yugoslavia. Following World War II, Jagodina was heavily industrialized and underwent a period of planned expansion and growth within communist Yugoslavia.

Jagodina was given the status of a city in December 2007.

Settlements
The City of Jagodina includes the following settlements:

Jagodina (proper)
Bagrdan
Belica
Bresje
Bukovče
Bunar
Vinorača
Voljavče
Vranovac
Vrba
Glavinci
Glogovac
Gornje Štiplje
Gornji Račnik
Deonica
Dobra Voda
Donje Štiplje
Donji Račnik
Dragocvet
Dragoševac
Dražmirovac
Duboka
Ivkovački Prnjavor
Jošanički Prnjavor
Kalenovac
Kovačevac
Kolare
Končarevo
Kočino Selo
Lovci
Lozovik (Jagodina)
Lukar
Majur
Mali Popović
Medojevac
Međureč
Miloševo
Mišević
Novo Lanište
Rajkinac
Rakitovo
Ribare
Ribnik
Siokovac
Slatina
Staro Lanište
Staro Selo
Strižilo
Topola
Trnava
Crnče
Šantarovac
Šuljkovac

Demographics

By 1837, Jagodina had 5,220 inhabitants, while Serbia proper had a population of 41,374. In the 1866 census, there were 4,429 inhabitants. Even until 1876, Jagodina was still an agricultural town with 91.88% of the population being in some way associated with agriculture.

By the 1930s Jagodina had 6,950 citizens, and by 1961 the town had 19,769 inhabitants. By 1971 the number grew to 27,500 and by 1991 it rose to 36,000, while the municipal area had 77,000 citizens.

Jagodina obtained city rights in December 2007. As of 2011, the city of Jagodina has a population of 71,852 inhabitants, while the urban area has 43,311 inhabitants.

Ethnic groups
The ethnic composition of the municipality:

Administration
Ratko Stevanović, vice president of United Serbia party, is the mayor of Jagodina. He was elected in May 2012. The President of City Assembly is Dragan Marković Palma, who was the mayor of Jagodina from 2004 to 2012.

Culture

Festivals
 Days of comedy
 Musical fall (Jagodina)
 Meeting of the village
 Etno fest

Theatres
 National theatre Jagodina
 Amateur theatre Jagodina
 Children's theatre Jagodina

Museums
 Museum of Jagodina
 Museum of Naïve and Marginal Art
 Wax Museum

Cinemas
Jagodina has one cinema also serving  as a theatre with some 400 seats.

Tourism
When the Aqua Park and Zoo opened, the tourism rate in Jagodina started to rise exponentially. More attractions were added in order to increase tourism. In April 2015, a new artificial waterfall was opened in the park "Potok". It was constructed in only twelve days, spanning the height of twelve meters. It is one of the longest waterfalls in Serbia, and it cost around 7 million dinars to complete. Jagodina attracted around 500,000 people in 2014 and 2015, and that number is expected to increase in the future. Besides those attractions, the city has a stadium and a sport centre, which provide space for sporting events.

Tourist attractions
Artificial waterfall
Jagodina built the largest artificial waterfall in the Balkans in 2014-2015. It is 8 meters high, and 12 meters wide, and at night the colors on the water change to different hues. The waterfall is in the city park where outdoor performances are held in the summer; it is part of a larger plan of reconstruction of the city. In the decade of 2005-2015,  the city has progressed as a tourist destination. Plans have been made to reconstruct all of the parks in the city and the city center.

Aqua Park

Jagodina recently opened an Aqua Park on July 24, 2007. Its opening attracted many people from Belgrade and other larger cities. Musical performers attend the opening.

Vivo shopping park
Vivo shopping park, opened 19 September 2014, spreads across 25,000 square meters, while the buildings themselves occupy 10,000 square meters. They contain around 33 stores which sell international and domestic products. Vivo shopping park attracts people not only from the local region, but from several other cities as well, including Belgrade.

Zoo
Jagodina opened its zoo on July 10, 2006, at a cost of 30 million Serbian dinars. The city invested 40% and donors provided 60% of the costs while the biggest donor was the Belgrade Zoo. The zoo is located in the complex of the city park "Đurđevo brdo", a designated nature park, with an area of 20,074 square meters. It has pedestrian zones for children, the old and disabled persons, and generally a high-quality infrastructure.

The Jagodina Zoo is the third largest in Serbia, next to Belgrade and Palić. It currently houses some 100 different species of animals.

Education
The first primary school in Jagodina was opened in 1808. Today, there are 11 primary schools in Jagodina of which 6 are in the city and five are in the rural area, with 36 regional offices. There are also 4 secondary schools and two universities, one public (founded in 1898) and one private (Megatrend University).

Economy and industry

Jagodina was heavily industrialized following World War II. The biggest factory in Jagodina is the cable factory. The Cable Factory Jagodina (FKS) was founded in 1947 and regular production began in 1955. In addition to cables, FKS produces connectors and similar cable products. FKS employs about 8,000 workers, and it is the biggest Serbian cable factory: 50% of Serbian cable is produced in Jagodina. About ⅔ of its production is placed on the foreign market, representing more than 60% of the total exports of the Serbian cable industry.

Other bigger factories include:
 FKS Cable factory
 Jagodina Brewery (since 1852)
 "Juhor" meat industry
 FEMAN - Cable accessories factory
 Metalka Majur - Cable accessories factory
 Biro inzenjering - Construction company
 Confezioni Andrea - Car cover factory

In the village of Lozovik there is an onyx mine, which is currently not functional.

Economic figures
The following table gives a preview of total number of registered people employed in legal entities per their core activity (as of 2018):

Traffic

Roads
As for the roads of regional significance, the following pass through the city:
 R.108 Ćuprija - Svilajnac
 R.110 Kragujevac - Svilajnac
 R.214 Kruševac - Paraćin - Lapovo (the old route of "Istanbul Road")
 R.217 from Gilja to Varvarin and Kruševac
 R.218 from regional road R.214 towards Rekovac

Railway
Railway stations in Jagodina are:
Miloševo
Bagrdan
Novo Lanište
Bukovče (Jagodina)
Jagodina (city)
Gilje

Airport
Jagodina Mayor Dragan Markovic Palma said on 16 January 2015 that Jagodina will get new airport and it will finish for 3 year.

Important dates in Jagodina
 1399 - The first mention of Jagodina
 1737 - Declaration of war against the Turks take place in Jagodina
 1808 - First primary school opened in Jagodina
 1846 - Glass factory opened in Jagodina called "Avramovac". It was the first glass factory in Serbia. 
 1884 -  First railway station built in Jagodina.
 1999 - Jagodina bombed by NATO forces

International relations

Twin towns — Sister cities
Jagodina is twinned with:
 Corinth, Greece
 Chrysoupoli, Greece
 Dubica, Bosnia-Herzegovina
 Delčevo, North Macedonia
 Marsa Alam, Egypt
 Novi Pazar, Serbia
 Verona, Italy
  Csepel, Hungary

Notable people
 Stevča Mihailović, Prime Minister of Serbia
 Milan Piroćanac, Prime Minister of Serbia
 Momčilo Ninčić, Minister, diplomat, politician, president of League of Nations 
 Petar Gračanin, President of the Presidency of SR Serbia
 Živorad Kovačević, diplomat, politician, NGO activist, academic and writer, Mayor of Belgrade
 Dušan A. Popović, Serbian politician
Bata Živojinović, Serbian actor
Goran Maksimović, Serbian sports shooter and 1988 Olympic champion
Duda Yankovich Former boxing light welterweight world champion.
Ivan Maksimović, guitarist and composer
Mir-Jam, Serbian writer
Milan Nikolić, musician and accordionist who represented Serbia with Marko Kon in the Eurovision Song Contest 2009
Zvonko Milojević, football player
Miloš Radojević, football player
Stefana Veljković, professional volleyball player, World and European champion, silver medalist at the 2016 Summer Olympics

See also
 List of places in Serbia
 Šumadija
 Pomoravlje

References
Notes

External links 

 
 Jagodina Museum of Naive and Marginal Arts 
 Jagodina Museum of Wax Figures
 Jagodina City Theatre 
 Jagodina Library 

 
Populated places in Pomoravlje District
Šumadija
Municipalities and cities of Šumadija and Western Serbia